Puru Dadheech (Purushottam Dadheech, 17 July 1939) is a Kathak dancer. He is a choreographer and educator of Indian classical dance, and is known for his pioneering work in the field of Kathak. At the oldest Kathak department which was formed in 1956 at Indira Kala Sangeet Vishwavidyalaya Public University located in Khairagarh, Puru Dadheech instated the first Kathak syllabus in 1961. He is the holder of the first Doctorate in Kathak Classical Dance and emphasizes the relevance of Shastras (Indian Ancient Dance treatises like Natyashastra and Nandikeshvara's Abhinaya Darpana) in the Kathak repertoire. He was awarded Padma Shri, the 4th highest civilian award of India He is currently serving as the Director of the world’s first dedicated Kathak research Centre at the Sri Sri University, Cuttack called Sri Sri Centre for Advanced Research in Kathak.

Education
Puru Dadheech studied under Guru-Shishya Parampara under Gurus Pt. Durga Prasad, Pt. Sunder Prasad as well as Pt. Narayan Prasad.

Dadheech is the first Doctorate (D.Mus.) in Kathak in the world. Research dissertation Kathak Nritya ka Udbhav aur Vikas by Prayag Sangeet Samiti.

He is the first-ever dancer to receive the Mahamahopadhyay (Hon. D.Lit.) from Akhil Bharatiya Gandharva Mahavidyalaya Mandal. 
Apart from the first Sangeetacharya (D.Mus.) in Kathak, he also has a PhD in Sanskrit Dramatics from Vikram University, Ujjain. His PHD was on the topic Sanskrit Prayog Vigyan Evam Kalidasiya Rupak which has been published as a book.

He has also received the Tagore National Fellowship by the Ministry of Culture.

Personal life 
Puru Dadheech was born to a traditional Pauranik brahmin family of Ujjain, Madhya Pradesh. He is married to kathak guru and researcher Dr. Vibha Dadheech. He has 2 sons.

Career
Dadheech had served as Professor and Head of the Dance Department at Bhatkhande University, Lucknow, and as Dean, Faculty of Arts, at Indira Kala Sangeet Vishwa Vidyalaya, Khairagarh, teaching and guiding several research scholars for their doctoral thesis.

Dadheech was close to Senior Kathak exponent and Guru Pt. Mohanrao Kallianpurkar and succeeded him at Bhatkhande Music Institute Deemed University.

Dadheech has been an editor for Swarn Jayanti Smarika Golden Jubilee Magazine of Bhatkhande Hindustani Sangeet Mahavidyala.

He participated in many seminars and delivered talks on subjects such as "Kalidasa and Natya Sashtra" at Birla Academy, Kolkata.

Puru Dadheech has developed the first-ever Kathak syllabus books which are instated in the Kathak department of various universities.

He has been on various editorial committees such as National Conference- "Innovation in Music And Dance"(23-24, Jan 2015) organized at Dept. Music And Dance, Govt. Maharani Laxmibai Girls P.G. college, Indore.

Dadheech has been a mentor and guide to several students doing Masters and Doctorate degrees in Kathak since 1961.

Awards

 Padma Shri 2020
 Sangeet Natak Akademi Award 2018
 Kalidas Samman 2021
 Maha Mahopadhyay from Akhil Bharatiya Gandharva Mahavidyalaya Mandal
 Madhya Pradesh Govt, M.P., Shikhar Samman Award 2004
 Sangeet Natak Academy, U.P., Academy Award 1984

Books
Dr. Dadheech has written many scholarly books which are also assigned as syllabus textbooks at Kathak departments of Universities.  Some titles are:
 Kathak Nritya Shiksha Part 1 
 Kathak Nritya Shiksha Part 2 
 Kathak Dance Syllabi 
 Abhinaya Darpan 
 Sanskrit Prayog Vigyan Evam Kalidasiya Rupak 
 Nrittasutram 
 Natyashastra ka Sangeet Vivechan 
 Ashtottar Shattaal Lakshanam 
 Bharatnatyam Shiksha 
 Pashchyat Nrityakala

Rare Compositions
Dr. Puru Dadheech is the only Kathak artist in India to have specially written and composed the Naayak Bheda – different types of heroes as well as conducting a workshop on rare compositions like 'Dashavatar' and 'Dhrupad' in 'Bhrama taal' (28 beats).

Re-instating Dhrupad in Kathak
Dadheech is India's first Kathak dancer to bring back Dhrupad to the formal Kathak stage and this composition in 28 matra. Shankar Pralayankar, his Dhrupad composition, has the unique status of regularly being sung in concerts by 'Dhrupad' maestros the Gundecha Brothers.

For the first time in 1981, Dr. Dadheech choreographed and danced the ancient Nritya style of Dhrupad that he performed in Mathura. He has researched and written an article titled Dhrupad Nartan Ki Parampara.

In 2013 ITC Sangeet Research Academy has conducted Dhrupad Seminar in association with National Centre for the Performing Arts (India) (NCPA, Mumbai) where Dr. Puru Dadheech participated as speaker to discuss Origin of Dhrupad (Predecessors of Dhrupad) evolving into different Banis and PROPAGATION OF DHRUPAD - During the reign of Mansingh Tomar and others. Dr. Puru Dadheech, discussed the origin of Dhrupad at length and established that Dhrupads are older than the times of Raja Mansingh Tomar.

80th birthday celebrations
Dadheech's 80th birthday celebrations on 17 July 2019 started with a National Seminar on the topic ‘Contributions of Dr Puru Dadheech in the field of Dance, Literature and Shastras at Indore city.  The chairperson for this seminar was Padma Shri Shovana Narayan. The Gundecha Brothers paid a tribute by singing three Dhrupad written by Puru Dadheech.

References

1939 births
Living people
Kathak exponents
Recipients of the Padma Shri in arts
Recipients of the Sangeet Natak Akademi Award